SUNY Ulster (Ulster County Community College) is a public community college with its main campus in Stone Ridge, New York, in Ulster County. It is part of the State University of New York (SUNY) system. The college also maintains facilities in Kingston at the Kingston Center of SUNY Ulster (KCSU).

Academics
SUNY Ulster offers over 60 undergraduate academic programs, including veterinary technology, graphic arts and fine arts, education, criminal justice, and nursing.

Campus

References

External links
Official website

Two-year colleges in the United States
SUNY community colleges
Educational institutions established in 1961
Education in Ulster County, New York
1961 establishments in New York (state)
NJCAA athletics